Bernard Jean (born 21 September 1948 in Jonquière, Quebec (now Saguenay, Quebec)) is a Canadian oboist, english horn player, conductor, and music educator. He has held principal oboist positions with several important Canadian orchestras, including the Quebec Symphony Orchestra and the Montreal Symphony Orchestra. In 1972 he co-founded the Quebec Woodwind Quintet; a group he played and recorded with for the next 15 years. In 1987 he founded the St Louis de France Ensemble, a group which he has conducted and recorded works by Caplet, Constant, Milhaud, and Patch. He has also performed as a soloist with the National Arts Centre Orchestra among other notable ensembles. A graduate of the Conservatoire de Paris and the Conservatoire de musique du Québec à Québec, he has taught on the music faculties of Laval University (1972-1975) and Conservatoire de musique du Québec à Montréal (1975-present).

References

1948 births
Living people
Male conductors (music)
Canadian music educators
Canadian oboists
Conservatoire de Paris alumni
Conservatoire de musique du Québec à Québec alumni
Academic staff of the Conservatoire de musique du Québec à Montréal
Cor anglais players
Male oboists
Musicians from Saguenay, Quebec
Academic staff of Université Laval
21st-century Canadian conductors (music)
21st-century Canadian male musicians